Lotta Tejle (born 17 March 1960) is a Swedish actress. In 2020, she had a leading role in the SVT dramedy-series Sommaren 85.

References

External links

21st-century Swedish actresses
1960 births
Living people